Ngaled is a small town in Indonesia.

Transport  

References 

Populated places in West Java